Meridemis vietorum is a species of moth of the family Tortricidae. It is found in northern Vietnam and Korea.

References

Moths described in 1989
Archipini